Dubatolovia is a monotypic genus of tiger moths in the family Erebidae. The genus includes only one species, Dubatolovia atrivena, which is found in western Africa (including Ghana), Cameroon, the Central African Republic, Zaire, Rwanda, Uganda and Angola.

The larvae feed on Erythroxylum coca, Chlorophoroa excelsa, Phytolacca dodecandra, Maeopsis eminii, Grewia mollis and Trema guineensis.

References 

 , 2010: Beitrag zur afrotropische Arctiidaefauna: Bemerkungen und Korrekturen zum Artenspektrum der Genera Creatonotos Hübner, [1819], Afrowatsonius Dubatolov, 2006 und Dubatolovia gen. n. (Lepidoptera: Arctiidae, Arctiinae). Nachrichten des Entomologische Vereins Apollo 31 (1/2): 1–8.
 Natural History Museum Lepidoptera generic names catalog

Insects of Cameroon
Spilosomina
Insects of the Democratic Republic of the Congo
Insects of Uganda
Fauna of the Central African Republic
Moths of Africa
Monotypic moth genera
Moths described in 1907